Torre Inbisa is a skyscraper in L'Hospitalet de Llobregat (suburb of Barcelona, Catalonia), Spain. It is named after its owner, Inbisa, a real state and construction company. Completed in 2010, has 25 floors and rises . It is on the Plaça d'Europa 9. It was designed by Nicanor García Architecture.

See also 
 List of tallest buildings and structures in Barcelona

References 

Skyscraper office buildings in Barcelona
Office buildings completed in 2008